Arche (Ark, often stylised as ARCHE) is an oratorio for soloists, choirs, organ and orchestra by Jörg Widmann. It was commissioned by Kent Nagano for the opening of the Elbphilharmonie. In the premiere on 13 January 2017, he conducted 300 performers.

Background

Jörg Widmann composed the oratorio ARCHE in 2016. Kent Nagano commissioned a full-length work for choir and orchestra and did not make any content restrictions. The commission of the Hamburg Philharmonic State Orchestra for the opening of the Elbphilharmonie has 300 performers with two soloists, two adult choirs and a children’s choir. Two child narrators chronicle the acts of creation and the flood. Widmann's work was inspired by the Elbphilharmonie under construction.

Structure
ARCHE is structured in five sections, in which Widmann roams through more than 3000 years of cultural and 300 years of music history. Antithetic or dualistic conceptions characterize large parts of the oratorio.

I – Fiat lux / Es werde Licht
 Let there be light is based on the Genesis creation narrative.
Beginning with silence: Let there be sound. At first noise-like sounds of wind and nature and "pitchless rustles and whispers". Air sounds and breath noises are created with wind instruments. The acts of creation are partly accompanied with heavenly chorales and burlesque, ironical musical episodes. Two children describe the act of creation.

II – Die Sintflut
 The flood is based on Genesis flood narrative and Noah's Ark.
The catastrophic character is manifested by cascading masses of sound.

III – Liebe
 Love
The center section is characterized by antiphony between the lovers (soprano and baritone) with tragic operatic fragments. All forms of love are found within it – dark, bright, joyous, vile and jealousy. Because of the jealousy of humans, Die Liebe leads to a double murder in a delusional fever.

IV – Dies irae
 Day of wrath
The strict setting of Dies irae represents the impending apocalypse. The human response is Friedrich Schiller's Ode to Joy. Widmann's setting of the poem cites Beethoven's Choral Fantasy.

V – Dona nobis pacem
 Grant us peace
Modern Zeitgeist is represented by an alphabet rap of the children's choir. The response is a Dona nobis pacem, performed by a boy soprano and the choirs. Man bears the fate of the earth in his own hands. The resolution of the final cadence is not complete.

Scoring
The setting contains voices and a large orchestra.
 Vocal soloists: soprano, baritone, boy soprano
 Choirs: children's choir, two mixed choirs
 two children narrators (boy and girl)

Instrumentation
 Woodwinds: 4 flutes (all with B foot, all doubling piccolo, 3rd doubling alto flute, 4th doubling bass flute), 4 oboes (2nd doubling oboe d'amore, 3rd and 4th doubling lotus flute, 3rd doubling cor anglais, 4th doubling heckelphone), 4 clarinets in B (all doubling in A, 2nd doubling clarinet in E, 3rd doubling bass clarinet in B, 4th doubling contrabass clarinet in B), 4 bassoons (3rd and 4th doubling double bassoon)
 Brass: 6 horns (1st and 2nd doubling natural horn), 4 trumpets in C (1st and 2nd doubling in B, 1st doubling high B ad lib.), 4 trombones (3rd and 4th doubling bass trombone ad lib.), tuba
 Strings: 16 violins I, 14 violins II, 12 violas, 10 cellos, 8 double basses (all with 5 strings)
 Percussion: 4 players, timpani
 2 harps, accordion, glass harmonica, 2 pianos (2nd doubling celesta), organ

Text
The language of the oratorio is German and Latin. Widmann selected a variety of texts from different centuries:
 Matthias Claudius
 Klabund
 Heinrich Heine
 Peter Sloterdijk
 Hans Christian Andersen
 Clemens Brentano
 Friedrich Schiller
 Francis of Assisi
 Friedrich Nietzsche
 Roland Schimmelpfennig
 Thomas of Celano
 Michelangelo

and from Des Knaben Wunderhorn, Bible and Mass.

Premiere
Widmann's oratorio ARCHE had its world premiere on 13 January 2017 on the occasion of the opening festivities of the Elbphilharmonie in Hamburg. It was performed by the Hamburg Philharmonic State Orchestra conducted by Kent Nagano. The choirs were Chor der Hamburgischen Staatsoper, Audi Jugendchorakademie and Hamburger Alsterspatzen.

Reception
A few German newspapers critically reviewed the premiere of ARCHE. The neue musikzeitung stated that the oratorio is capable of winning a majority. Eleonore Büning, reviewer of the Frankfurter Allgemeine Zeitung, wrote about the enthusiasm of the audience, and that Widmann's splendid, richly orchestrated music breaks all genre and style boundaries. Süddeutsche Zeitung wrote, that the work is diverging, and also undecided in its message. Andrew Clements, reviewer of The Guardian, wrote about the CD production: "fails to convince".

Awards
Widmann received the  "Composer of the Year" 2019 Award for ARCHE.

Recording
 Arche, Marlis Petersen, Thomas E. Bauer, Iveta Apkalna, Kent Nagano, Philharmonisches Staatsorchester Hamburg  (ECM 2018)

Notes

References

Citations

Sources
 

Compositions by Jörg Widmann
Oratorios
21st-century classical music
2016 compositions
Music commissioned by the Hamburg Philharmonic State Orchestra
Oratorios based on the Bible